Rasikbil, also known as Rasik Bil or Rasikbeel, is a small lake situated in the Cooch Behar district of West Bengal, India. The nearest town is Kamakhyaguri.

Fauna
This lake attracts a variety of birds. They make nests in the trees around the lake. The bird species which live in and around the lake includes cormorants, different varieties of storks, ibis, spoonbill, kingfisher, parrots, owls, and many others. There is a deer park and a crocodile rehabilitation center by the side of the lake. There is also a leopard house, python house, aviary, and tortoise rescue entre. Birds species include lesser whistling duck, Eurasian teal, ferruginous duck, red-crested pochard, northern shoveler, northern pintail, Eurasian wigeon, grey-headed lapwing, northern lapwing, pied kingfisher, stork-billed kingfisher, common kingfisher, little cormorant, great cormorant, and gadwall.

Location
Rasikbil is situated in Cooch Behar district, Tufanganj subdivision. The nearest town Kamakhyaguri. The nearest railway station is Kamakhyaguri Railway Station. Cars are available for hire at the station.

Gallery

References

Lakes of West Bengal
Tourist attractions in Cooch Behar district